A voiceless velar implosive is a rare consonantal sound, used in some oral languages. A dedicated IPA letter, was withdrawn in 1993.

Features
Features of the voiceless velar implosive:

Occurrence 
A phonemic  has not been confirmed for any language. It has been claimed for Lendu, but it is more likely to be creaky-voiced , as in Hausa. Some English speakers use a voiceless velar implosive  to imitate the "glug-glug" sound of liquid being poured from a bottle, though others use a voiced implosive .

See also 
 Voiced velar implosive

References

External links
 

Velar consonants
Implosives
Voiceless oral consonants